Pasamalar is a 2013 - 2016 Indian Tamil-language soap opera that aired on Sun TV.  It is a prime time serial. The show premiered on 7 October 2013 to 1 January 2017 for 1000 episodes. It was initially aired from Monday to Friday at 6:30PM IST and later extended up to Saturday. The show starred Stalin, Chandra Lakshman and Shamily Sukumar in the lead roles as Poovarasu, Thamarai and Mallika. while, Pavani Reddy, Pradeep Kumar, Yuvarani, Shilpa Mary Teresa, Jeevitha, Guru Aravind, Bhuvaneshwari and others playing a supporting roles. It is produced by Home Movie Makers and directed by Sadhasivam Perumaal and Azhagar, S.Sundarmoorthy.

It revolves around the lives of 3 siblings, whose affection and love remain unchanged through highs and lows. Poovarasu (Stalin) has been taking care of his two younger sisters, Thamarai (Chandra Lakshman) and Mallika (Shamily Sukumar) from the age of 10 after their parents' untimely. It is currently re telecasting in Kalaignar TV since 12 December 2022 at 9.30 PM.

Plot
Paasamalar is a story about the love shared by an elder brother and his two younger sisters. Poovarasu is taking care of his sisters, Thamarai and Mallika, from the age of ten after his parents died. Poovarasu sacrifices his interests and desires to care for his sisters. He works in a small engineering factory, Thamarai takes care of the family while Mallika goes to college and has a different attitude towards life.

Cast
 Stalin as Poovarasu (1–1000)
 Leena Nair ("Pritika") (1–197) → Chandra Lakshman (197–1000) as Thamarai - Poovarasu's 1st younger sister
 Laxmy Priya (1–85) → Shamily Sukumar (85–1000) as Mallika - Poovarasu's 2nd younger sister
 Nithin Iyer (1–100) → Sathya Shyam (100–1000) as Vimal - Mallika's husband
 Guru Aravind (1–1000) as Paarivendan "Paari" - Thamarai's husband
 Devipriya (1–351) → Shilpa Mary Teresa (378–1000) as Kokila - Poovarasu's 1st wife
 Shilpa also portrayed as Mary (715–900) – Kokila's medium, a Christian
 Sherin Farhana as Ahalya (665–1000) – Poovarasu and Kokila's daughter
 Lakshmi Viswanath (1–333) → Jeevitha (675–1000) as Uma - Poovarasu's ex-lover latter his 2nd wife
 Pavani Reddy as Bharathi (675–1000) – Mallika's best friend
 Pradeep Kumar as Pradeep (700–1000) – Bharathi's husband
 Naresh Eswar as Vikram (765–1000) – Bharathi's cousin
 Yuvarani as Vaitheeshwari (755–1000) – Bharathi's arch-rival
 Jennifer Antony (100–415) → Bhuvaneswari (415–765)  as Bhuvaneshwari - Thamarai and Mallika's arch-rival (Dead)
 Priya as Karpagam – Poovarasu's aunt (1–1000)
 Gaayathri Yuvaraj as Eshwari (1–1000) – Paari's 1st younger sister
 Sambhavi Gurumoorthy as Vennila (1–1000) – Paari's 2nd younger sister
 Bharathi Kannan (1–375) → Azhagu (376–1000) as Kaliappan – Paari's father
 Rekha Suresh as Maragatham (700–1000) – Bharathi's mother
 Sathya Sai Krishnan (725–1000) as Narmada – Bharathi's younger sister
 Naga lakshmi as Annapoorani (1–1000) – Paari's mother
 Krithika Ladoo as Jennifer (1–1000) – Vimal's best friend
 Syamantha Kiran as Devi – Bhuvaneshwari's younger sister (575–988) (Dead)
 Vinoth Sampath as Sanjay (1–990) (Dead) – Bhuvaneshwari's son also Vennila's ex-lover
 Aravind as Surya – Paari's best friend (498–615)
 Shweta as Shruthi (500–615) – Surya's wife
 Manoharan as Thangamani – Pradeep's father (815–1000)
 Deepa Nethran as Raji – Pradeep's mother (815–1000)
 Sabarna as Swathi / Kumuthini (696–733) – Paari's housemaid
 Aanandhi as Kayal (725–1000) – Bharathi's elder sister
 Suresh
 Shyam as Shyam (728–1000) – Kayal's husband
 Sripriya as Valli – Paari's elder sister (1–1000)
 Sivaranjani as Charu – Paari's ex-lover (1–300)
 Annapoorni as Alamelumangai
 J. Lalitha as Mary's mother
 Subbaiyah (1–350)
 Karthick Vasudevan as Chezhiyan (1–357)
 Murali Kumar
 Dubbing Janaki

Guest appearances
 Khushbu as Kushboo
 Sujitha Dhanush as Goddess Amman

Awards and nominations

See also
 List of programs broadcast by Sun TV

References

External links
 Official Website 
 Sun TV on YouTube
 Sun TV Network 
 Sun Group 

Sun TV original programming
Tamil-language fantasy television series
2013 Tamil-language television series debuts
Tamil-language television shows
2016 Tamil-language television series endings